Vertagopus is a genus of springtails belonging to the family Isotomidae.

Species
The following species are recognised in the genus Vertagopus:
 Vertagopus abeloosi Poinsot, 1965
 Vertagopus alpinus Haybach, 1972
 Vertagopus alpus Christiansen & Bellinger, 1980
 Vertagopus arborata Huifen & Yueling, 1993
 Vertagopus arboreus (Linnæus, C, 1758)
 Vertagopus arcticus Martynova, 1969
 Vertagopus asiaticus Potapov, M, Gulgenova, A et Babykina, M, 2016
 Vertagopus beta Christiansen & Bellinger, 1980
 Vertagopus brevicaudus (Carpenter, 1900)
 Vertagopus ceratus Potapov, M, Gulgenova, A et Babykina, M, 2016
 Vertagopus ciliatus Christiansen, K, 1958
 Vertagopus cinereus (Nicolet, H, 1842)
 Vertagopus haagvari Fjellberg, A, 1996
 Vertagopus helveticus Haybach, 1980
 Vertagopus laricis Martynova, 1975
 Vertagopus monta (Christiansen & Bellinger, 1980)
 Vertagopus montanus Stach, 1947
 Vertagopus nunataki Lafooraki, et al., 2020
 Vertagopus obscurus Wahlgren, 1906
 Vertagopus pallidus Martynova, 1974
 Vertagopus persea Wray, 1952
 Vertagopus persicus Lafooraki, et al., 2020
 Vertagopus pseudocinereus Fjellberg, 1975
 Vertagopus reuteri (Schött, H, 1893)
 Vertagopus sarekensis Poinsot, 1965
 Vertagopus tianschanicus Martynova, 1969
 Vertagopus westerlundi (Reuter, 1898)
 Vertagopus sp. 1 Fjellberg, A, 1996
 Vertagopus sp. 2 Fjellberg, A, 1996
 Vertagopus sp. 3 Janssens F & Duncan WL, 2019

References

Collembola
Springtail genera